Capital Dance (styled Capital DANCE) is a national digital radio station in the United Kingdom, owned and operated by Global and run as a spin-off from Capital. The station broadcasts from studios at Leicester Square in London alongside its siblings Capital and Capital Xtra. The station predominantly plays contemporary and current electronic dance music. Capital Dance broadcasts nationally, transmitted on Digital One in the DAB+ format, and online. To enable the addition of the station to Digital One, several other Global stations on the platform, including Capital UK, Heart UK, Capital XTRA Reloaded, Gold and Heart 70s, saw a reduction in their broadcast bandwidth.

As of December 2022, the station broadcasts to a weekly audience of 912,000, according to RAJAR.

History

The station's launch at 4pm on 1 October 2020 followed both the establishment in 2019 of Global's Heart Dance as an older-skewing classic and contemporary dance and rhythmic music station, and the decision to reorientate Capital Xtra back towards predominantly playing Black and urban music genres. One week after the launch of Capital Dance, the BBC Radio 1 Dance stream was launched on BBC Sounds; the BBC's plans for this had been announced prior to Capital Dance being revealed.

Following the successful launch of the station, a breakfast show hosted by Rio Fredrika was added to the station schedule from 4 January 2021, with former KISS presenter Charlie Powell joining the station as well. Later, in July 2021, shows hosted by Karen Nyame (known on-air as KG) and Jess Bays were added to the schedule.

As part of schedule changes across the whole of the Capital network in October 2022, Matty Chiabi, Meg McHugh, and Zofia all joined the station as presenters. At the same time, Rio Fredrika left Capital Dance to present a weekday show on Capital UK, with Charlie Powell taking over the breakfast show slot.

Presenters
On-Air Presenters
 Charlie Powell (Monday  Friday,   ; Saturday)
 Matty Chiabi (Monday  Friday)
 MistaJam (Tuesday  Saturday,   ; Friday  Saturday)
 Coco Cole (Monday  Thursday)
 Meg McHugh (Monday,   ; Friday,   ; Saturday  Sunday)
 Zofia Rogers (Saturday  Sunday)

References 

 https://www.capitaldance.com/how-to-listen/online/

Global Radio
Radio stations established in 2020